The Great Indian Film and Literature Festival (abbreviated as GIFLIF) is a film and literary festival in India, started in 2012. It is India's first film and literature festival. The festival conducts film screenings, theater presentations, poetry reading, musical concerts and workshops. The Great Indian Film and Literature Festival is supported by the Department of Culture and Department of Tourism, and the Government of Madhya Pradesh.

History 
The GIFLIF was founded in 2012 by Karan Kukreja and Manoj Kukreja. It was formerly known as the Gurgaon International Film and Literature Festival. The festival has three successfully running chapters in Gurgaon (2015, 2016), Bhopal (2016, 2017, 2018) and Raipur (2018).

Editions

1st Edition 
The first edition of GIFLIF was held at DLF CyberHub in Gurgaon, Haryana in December 2015. The festival showcased 1764 films from all around the world. The following authors, film and literary personalities participated in the 1st edition:
 Subhash Ghai
 Gulzar
 Piyush Mishra
 Shabana Azmi
 Pallavi Joshi
 Avirook Sen
 Sudhir Mishra

2nd Edition 
The second edition of GIFLIF was held in October 2016 at Jehan Numa Palace Hotel in Bhopal, Madhya Pradesh. The following authors, film and literary personalities participated in the 2nd edition:
 Gulzar
 Gopaldas Neeraj
 Prakash Jha
 Sudhir Mishra
 Piyush Mishra 
 Kiran Nagarkar

3rd Edition 
The third edition of GIFLIF was held at DLF Cyber Hub in Gurgaon, Haryana from 2 December 2016 to 4 December 2018 to showcase the vernacular spirit of Indian film and literature. The festival was inaugurated by Padma Vibhushan Adoor Gopalakrishnan and author Ruskin Bond. In this three-day festival, there were a panel discussion on film production, digital media, advertising, publishing, literature, scriptwriting and film screenings. The following film and literary personalities participated in the 3rd edition:
 Adoor Gopalakrishnan
 Subhash Ghai
 Prakash Jha
 Ruskin Bond
 Kiran Nagarkar
 Piyush Mishra
 Rajshekhar
 Rajat Kapoor
 Vinay Pathak
 Juhi Chaturvedi
 Major General G. D. Bakshi
 Anjum Rajabali
 Anurag Batra
 Anand Neelakantan
 Sharat Katariya
 Rajkumar Gupta
 Rahul Roushan
 Arunabh Kumar

4th Edition 
The 4th edition of GIFLIF was held at Hotel Lake View Ashok in Bhopal, Madhya Pradesh from August 4, 2017 to August 6, 2018. The following authors, film and literary personalities participated in the 4th edition: 
 Vinay Pathak
 Rajat Kapoor
 Jayprad Desai
 Ashok Chakradhar
 Rahat Indori
 Ruskin Bond
 Varun Gandhi
 Vijay Tiwari
 Sheela Mishra
 Piyush Mishra
 Javed Akhtar

5th Edition 
The fifth edition of GIFLIF was held in Raipur, the capital of Chhattisgarh. It was inaugurated by Raman Singh, the Chief Minister of Chhattisgarh on 5 January 2018. Actor Piyush Mishra's band Ballimaran, performed his famous poems like Ik Bagal' and 'Aarambh Hai Prachand'. Piyush Mishra also recited his latest poem titled Tum Meri Jaan Ho Raziya Bee, at the GIFLIF's Raipur chapter. The Amir A Social Spark,  a book by Dr. Kirti Sisodia, was also released by CM Raman Singh. The following authors, film and literary personalities participated in the 5th edition: 
 Gopaldas Neeraj
 Ruskin Bond
 Raman Singh
 Saurabh Shukla
 Surender Sharma
 Ravinder Singh
 Rahat Indori
 Shakeel Azmi
 Piyush Mishra
 Abhishek Acharya

Patrons 
AISECT University, Screenwriters Association, and Whistling Woods International are some of its patrons. The festival is supported by the Department of Culture and the Department of Tourism,  Government of Madhya Pradesh.

See also 

 Literary festival
 Film festival
 List of literary festivals in India

References

External links

Film festivals in India
Film festivals established in 2012
Literary festivals in India
Festivals established in 2012
2012 establishments in India
Annual events in India